Frederick Fowke may refer to:

Frederick Luther Fowke (1857–1939), merchant and political figure in Ontario, Canada
Sir Frederick Gustavus Fowke, 1st Baronet (1782–1856), of the Fowke baronets
Sir Frederick Thomas Fowke, 2nd Baronet (1816–1897), of the Fowke baronets
Sir Frederick Ferrers Conant Fowke, 3rd Baronet (1879–1948), of the Fowke baronets
Sir Frederick Woollaston Rawdon Fowke, 4th Baronet (1910–1987), of the Fowke baronets

See also
Fowke (surname)